Théo Kueny (12 December 1894 – 20 May 1978) was a French wrestler. He competed in the Greco-Roman bantamweight at the 1924 Summer Olympics.

References

External links
 

1894 births
1978 deaths
People from Alsace-Lorraine
Olympic wrestlers of France
Wrestlers at the 1924 Summer Olympics
French male sport wrestlers
Sportspeople from Haut-Rhin